Ernest S. Williams may refer to:
 Ernest S. Williams (minister), general superintendent of the Assemblies of God
 Ernest Williams (conductor), American band conductor, composer and music educator

See also
 Ernest Williams (disambiguation)